Waldron is a surname. Notable people with the surname include:

Adelaide Cilley Waldron (1843-1909), American author, editor, clubwoman
Adelbert Waldron, United States Army sniper
Alfred M. Waldron, United States politician
Daniel Waldron, last holder of extensive Waldron real estate in Dover, New Hampshire
Duncan Waldron, astronomer and photographer
Henry Waldron, United States politician
Irv Waldron, baseball player
John Waldron (disambiguation), several people, including
John C. Waldron, United States Navy aviator
Jeremy Waldron, legal philosopher
Kathleen Waldron, president of Baruch College of the City University of New York
Mal Waldron, composer and pianist
Michael Waldron, American screenwriter and producer
Major Richard Waldron, second "president" of Colonial New Hampshire
Richard Waldron (colonel), prominent officeholder in colonial New Hampshire
Richard Waldron (Secretary), leading opponent of the Wentworth oligarchy in colonial New Hampshire
Richard Russell Waldron, purser and special agent to the Wilkes Expedition
Thomas Westbrook Waldron, Militia captain at siege of Louisburg (1745), royal New Hampshire councillor, patriot
Thomas Westbrook Waldron (consul), first U.S. consul to Hong Kong, captain's secretary to the Wilkes Expedition

Fictional characters:
Connell Waldron, character in the Irish TV series Normal People, based on the novel Normal People
Sam Waldron, character in the British children's TV series Postman Pat